AirGotland is the trading name of the Swedish Virtual airline Air Gotland Express AB.

History
AirGotland was first founded by a local initiative on the Swedish island of Gotland, under the working title Nya Gotlandsflyget (The new Gotland airplane). And on 28 May 2020, they announced the new name AirGotland, after a name contest. On 17 July 2020, AirGotland announced their new commercial partner Polish airline SprintAir. The Polish airline will operate a Saab 340 on behalf of AirGotland on their routes. The airline's first route will be Visby - Stockholm Bromma, and plans to start flying during August 2020.

The airline commenced operations 13 August 2020, with one to three daily flights between Visby and Stockholm Bromma.

Destinations
This is a list of destinations operated by AirGotland:

Fleet
As of August 2020, the AirGotland fleet consists of the following aircraft:

References

External links 

Airlines of Sweden
Airlines established in 2020
2020 establishments in Sweden
Visby